Yitha-Yitha is a moribund language of southern South Australia spoken by the Yitha Yitha people. The language was studied in the 1980s. Yita Yita has many monosyllabic words, consonant finals and consonant clusters. Many Yita Yita place names include the words tin meaning foot, and cabul meaning leg.

References

Lower Murray languages
Indigenous Australian languages in South Australia